Acragas longipalpus is a species of jumping spider in the genus Acragas. The scientific name of this species was first published in 1885 by Peckham & Peckham. These spiders are  found in Guatemala.

References

External links 

longipalpus
Spiders described in 1885
Spiders of Central America